Pseudoalteromonas luteoviolacea is a marine bacterium which was isolated from seawater near Nice.

History
P. luteoviolacea was originally isolated in 1976 and named Alteromonas luteo-violaceus. However, this name was amended to Alteromonas luteoviolacea in 1982 to comply with standard bacterial naming. In 1995, several species of Alteromonas, including A. luteoviolacea, were reclassified under the newly created genus Pseudoalteromonas based on ribosomal RNA comparisons.

References

External links
 
Type strain of Pseudoalteromonas luteoviolacea at BacDive -  the Bacterial Diversity Metadatabase

Alteromonadales